Kuran-e Kordiyeh (also Romanized as Kūrān-e Kordīyeh; also known as Kūrān Korvīyeh, Kūrār Korvīyeh, and Kūrān) is a village in Hesar Rural District, Khabushan District, Faruj County, North Khorasan Province, Iran. At the 2006 census, its population was 585, in 141 families.

References 

Populated places in Faruj County